Gunnar Henrik Bucht (born 5 August 1927) is a Swedish composer and musicologist. Bucht studied composition with Karl-Birger Blomdahl, Carl Orff, and Max Deutsch, among others.

Soprano Alice Esty gave the world premiere of his 1965 composition Sex Årstidssånger in May 1966 at Carnegie Hall.

References

External links
Gunnar Bucht's Homepage

1927 births
Living people

Contemporary classical music in Sweden
Swedish classical composers
Swedish male classical composers
Place of birth missing (living people)
20th-century Swedish composers